Musurgina is a monotypic moth genus of the family Noctuidae. Its only species, Musurgina laeta, is found on Madagascar. Both the genus and species were first described by Karl Jordan in 1921.

References

Agaristinae
Monotypic moth genera